The relative expansion of the universe is parametrized by a dimensionless scale factor . Also known as the cosmic scale factor or sometimes the Robertson Walker scale factor, this is a key parameter of the  Friedmann equations.

In the early stages of the Big Bang, most of the energy was in the form of radiation, and that radiation was the dominant influence on the expansion of the universe. Later, with cooling from the expansion the roles of matter and radiation changed and the universe entered a matter-dominated era. Recent results suggest that we have already entered an era dominated by dark energy, but examination of the roles of matter and radiation are most important for understanding the early universe.

Using the dimensionless scale factor to characterize the expansion of the universe, the effective energy densities of radiation and matter scale differently. This leads to a radiation-dominated era  in the very early universe but a transition to a matter-dominated era at a later time and, since about 4 billion years ago, a subsequent dark-energy-dominated era.

Detail
Some insight into the expansion can be obtained from a Newtonian expansion model which leads to a simplified version of the Friedmann equation. It relates the proper distance (which can change over time, unlike the comoving distance  which is constant and set to today's distance) between a pair of objects, e.g. two galaxy clusters, moving with the Hubble flow in an expanding or contracting FLRW universe at any arbitrary time  to their distance at some reference time . The formula for this is:

The evolution of the scale factor is a dynamical question, determined by the equations of general relativity, which are presented in the case of a locally isotropic, locally homogeneous universe by the Friedmann equations.

The Hubble parameter is defined as:

where the dot represents a time derivative. The Hubble parameter varies with time, not with space, with the Hubble constant  being its current value.

From the previous equation  one can see that , and also that , so combining these gives , and substituting the above definition of the Hubble parameter gives  which is just Hubble's law.

Current evidence suggests that the expansion rate of the universe is accelerating, which means that the second derivative of the scale factor  is positive, or equivalently that the first derivative  is increasing over time. This also implies that any given galaxy recedes from us with increasing speed over time, i.e. for that galaxy  is increasing with time. In contrast, the Hubble parameter seems to be decreasing with time, meaning that if we were to look at some fixed distance d and watch a series of different galaxies pass that distance, later galaxies would pass that distance at a smaller velocity than earlier ones.

Chronology

Radiation-dominated era
After Inflation, and until about 47,000 years  after the Big Bang, the dynamics of the early universe were set by radiation (referring generally to the constituents of the universe which moved relativistically, principally photons and neutrinos).

For a radiation-dominated universe the evolution of the  scale factor in the Friedmann–Lemaître–Robertson–Walker metric is obtained solving the Friedmann equations:

Matter-dominated era
Between about 47,000 years and 9.8 billion years after the Big Bang, the energy density of matter exceeded both the energy density of radiation  and the vacuum energy density.

When the early universe was about 47,000 years old (redshift 3600), mass–energy density surpassed the radiation energy, although the universe remained optically thick to radiation until the universe was about 378,000 years old (redshift 1100). This second moment in time (close to the time of recombination), at which the photons which compose the cosmic microwave background radiation were last scattered, is often mistaken as marking the end of the radiation era.

For a matter-dominated universe the evolution of the scale factor in the Friedmann–Lemaître–Robertson–Walker metric is easily obtained solving the Friedmann equations:

Dark-energy-dominated era
In physical cosmology, the dark-energy-dominated era is proposed as the last of the three phases of the known universe, the other two being the matter-dominated era and the radiation-dominated era. The dark-energy-dominated era began after the matter-dominated era, i.e. when the Universe was about 9.8 billion years old. In the era of cosmic inflation, the Hubble parameter is also thought to be constant, so the expansion law of the dark-energy-dominated era also holds for the inflationary prequel of the big bang.

The cosmological constant is given the symbol Λ, and, considered as a source term in the Einstein field equation, can be viewed as equivalent to a "mass" of empty space, or dark energy.  Since this increases with the volume of the universe, the expansion pressure is effectively constant, independent of the scale of the universe, while the other terms decrease with time. Thus, as the density of other forms of matter – dust and radiation – drops to very low concentrations, the cosmological constant (or "dark energy") term will eventually dominate the energy density of the Universe.  Recent measurements of the change in Hubble constant with time, based on observations of distant supernovae, show this acceleration in expansion rate, indicating the presence of such dark energy.

For a dark-energy-dominated universe, the evolution of the scale factor in the Friedmann–Lemaître–Robertson–Walker metric is easily obtained solving the Friedmann equations:

Here, the coefficient in the exponential, the Hubble constant, is

This exponential dependence on time makes the spacetime geometry identical to the de Sitter universe, and only holds for a positive sign of the cosmological constant, which is the case according to the currently accepted value of the cosmological constant, Λ, that is approximately 

See also
Cosmological principle
Lambda-CDM model
Redshift

Notes

References

External links
Relation of the scale factor with the cosmological constant and the Hubble constant

Physical cosmology